Vega Telecom Inc. is a Filipino telecommunications company jointly owned by Globe Telecom and PLDT. It was established as a holding company of San Miguel Corporation for its various telecommunications investments. In separate statements on May 30, 2016, Globe Telecom and PLDT each acquired half of Vega Telecom from San Miguel Corporation for P69.1 billion. The acquisition entailed P52.08 billion for 100% equity interest in Vega Telecom and the assumption of around P17.02 billion of liabilities. The deal was closed in May 30, 2017.

Subsidiaries
 Bell Telecommunications Philippines, Inc.
 Eastern Telecommunications Philippines Inc.
 Liberty Telecommunications Holdings, Inc. 
 Cobaltpoint Telecommunications Philippines, Inc. (formerly Express Telecom)
 Hi-Frequency Telecommunications, Inc.
 Tori Spectrum Telecommunications, Inc.

References

External links
BellTel
Eastern Communications
Liberty Telecoms Holdings
wi-Tribe Philippines

PLDT
Globe Telecom
Telecommunications companies of the Philippines
Companies based in Mandaluyong